Aleksandr Sergeyevich Samedov (born 19 July 1984) is a Russian professional football official and a former player who played as a right winger. He has played for the Russia national football team since 2011 and was selected for the 2014 and 2018 FIFA World Cup.

Personal life
Samedov was born in Moscow, Soviet Union, his father is Azerbaijani and his mother is Russian. He is a Christian and is married to Yuliya.

Club career

He was a student of the Spartak Moscow academy and was considered one of their most talented youngsters. He was a regular in the first team under Nevio Scala but when Aleksandrs Starkovs came he lost his place in the first team. Spartak Moscow then purchased Vladimir Bystrov, and in the summer of 2005 Samedov left for Lokomotiv Moscow for €3.4 million. However, Samedov failed to succeed in Loko, and in 2008 joined FC Moscow. Having shown great progress under direction of Miodrag Božović, he chose to become part of a bigger club and went to Dynamo Moscow during the 2009–10 winter transfer period. On 27 June 2012, Samedov moved to Lokomotiv, where he played earlier. According to the source close to the club, Lokomotiv paid about 8.2 million € for his services.

During his second spell at Lokomotiv, Samedov established himself as starting XI fixture at right wing. In May 2013, when he added some goals to his usual good amount of assistances, he managed to win monthly poll among Loko fans in the social networks for the best player of the month. He won this poll for the second time in April 2014. After the end of 2013–14 season, club organized new poll among Loko fans in the social networks to name the best player of the season. The award went to Samedov with 32.3 percent of votes.

On 16 January 2017, he returned to FC Spartak Moscow, winning the Russian Premier League title at the end of the season. He was released from his Spartak contract by mutual consent on 5 January 2019.

On 13 January 2019, he signed with Krylia Sovetov Samara.

On 28 August 2019, he signed with semi-professional side Znamya Noginsk.

On 27 October 2019, he retired from football. He restarted his career after Znamya Noginsk was promoted to the third-tier Russian Professional Football League for the 2020–21 season. He retired again in January 2021 and was appointed scout by FC Lokomotiv Moscow. He left Lokomotiv in 2022.

International career

In 2003, Samedov first visited Baku to hold discussions on representing the Azerbaijan national football team. He rejected the offer as it would have meant he had to rescind his Russian passport.

At international level Samedov has played for the Russia U-21s. He was called up to the Russia national football team in late September 2011 for the first time. On 7 October 2011, Samedov made his debut for the senior national team of Russia after coming on as a last-minute substitute for Alan Dzagoev in the 1–0 away win against Slovakia in a Euro 2012 qualifier.

On 2 June 2014, he was included in  Russia's 2014 FIFA World Cup squad.

On 11 May 2018, he was included in Russia's extended 2018 FIFA World Cup squad. On 3 June 2018, he was included in the finalized World Cup squad. He started Russia's every game in the World Cup, but was substituted in the second half in 3 out of 5, including both knock-out stage games.

Following Russia's 2018 FIFA World Cup quarterfinal loss to Croatia, he announced his retirement from the national team.

Career statistics

Club statistics

International
Statistics accurate as of match played 7 July 2018.

International goals
 (Russia score listed first, score column indicates score after each Samedov goal)

Honours

Clubs
Lokomotiv Moscow
Russian Cup: 2006–07, 2014–15, 2016–17
Spartak Moscow
Russian Premier League: 2016–17
Russian Super Cup: 2017

References

External links

1984 births
Living people
Russian footballers
Russia under-21 international footballers
Russia international footballers
2014 FIFA World Cup players
UEFA Euro 2016 players
2017 FIFA Confederations Cup players
Association football midfielders
FC Lokomotiv Moscow players
FC Spartak Moscow players
FC Moscow players
FC Dynamo Moscow players
PFC Krylia Sovetov Samara players
Footballers from Moscow
Russian Premier League players
Russian sportspeople of Azerbaijani descent
Russian people of Azerbaijani descent
Converts to Christianity
Russian Christians
2018 FIFA World Cup players